Chachapoyas is a province of the Amazonas Region, Peru. The province of Chachapoyas was a part of the department of Trujillo (according to the supreme decree of February 12, 1821) being its capital the city of Chachapoyas.

After the department of Amazonas was created, by law of November 21, 1832, it became a province of the Amazonas region, and the city of Chachapoyas remained a regional capital. Its principal quarters are:

To the north: Luya Urco and Santo Domingo 
To the south: Yanco and La Laguna.

Two principal rivers cover its territory: the Utcubamba, which runs from south to north and which right margin is dedicated to the agriculture in diverse form; and the Sonche, which runs from east to west and it is born from the meeting of several creeks that go down the heights of Molino Pampa district. This river flows into the Utcubamba along with the Huancachaca. It has a short trip, its beaches are narrow and its areas are unusable because its slopes are rocky and steep.

In Shihual, a Magdalena's district, there are many calcareous caverns, which stalactites and stalagmites formations serve as habitat to diverse night birds.

La Jalca has the privilege of being the first Spanish city that has been founded in the region: in effect, captain Alonso de Alvarado, conqueror of the Amazonas, on September 5, 1538 founded there the first city of San Juan de la Frontera de los Chachapoyas, which then would be moved to the place that it occupies now.

For Peter Lerche, an anthropologist, in la Jalca there is the legitimate Andean pre-Hispanic indigenous Peruvian culture, with traditional towns like Conila, Levanto, Colcamar, Luya. Fruit of his investigations initiated in 1980, he has published "Chachapoyas, travelers' guide". In this book he proposes some tourist circuits. The first one of them, the shortest, can take in average 5 days, and the others, for more adventurous spirits, can take in average 15 days.

Political division
Chachapoyas is divided into twenty-one districts, which are:

See also 
 Administrative divisions of Peru
 Machu Pirqa
 Purum Llaqta, Cheto
 Purum Llaqta, Soloco
 Quchapampa

External links
Chachapoyas province official website 

Chachapoyas Province